Dragan Rosić (born 15 November 1996) is a Serbian footballer who plays as a goalkeeper for Radnički Niš.

Club career

Jedinstvo Putevi
Born in Užice, Rosić started his career with local football club Jedinstvo Putevi. During the 2014–15 Serbian First League season he was used several times as a reserve goalkeeper in the first team squad. After the club relegated in the Serbian League West, Rosić started the 2015–16 as a first choice goalkeeper, but due to injury he earned in the 10 fixture match, against Šumadija 1903 when he was substituted out, he missed the rest of season. He collected 9 league caps as a bonus player and a cup appearance against Zemun.

Mladost Lučani
After a trial period he passed with the club, Rosić signed a three-year scholarship contract with Mladost Lučani in summer 2016. Next the whole first half-season he spent as a back-up for Nemanja Krznarić, Rosić was loaned on dual registration to Kolubara. After he played 5 matches for the club, Rosić returned to Mladost due to Krznarić's injury. He made his debut for Mladost Lučani in 29 fixture of the 2016–17 Serbian SuperLiga season, played on 9 April 2017, when he was nominated for a man of the match against Čukarički. In summer 2017, Rosić signed his first four-year professional contract with Mladost. At the beginning of new season, Rosić stayed on the bench as an unused substitution in second leg of the second qualifying round for the 2017–18 UEFA Europa League, against Inter Baku. Following the game, Mladost had been eliminated from the further competition after 5–0 aggregate for Inter. Later, during the 2017–18 Serbian SuperLiga campaign, Rosić was named for the first choice goalkeeper, collecting 33 matches in both domestic competitions. Beside the 10th place on the final SuperLiga table, Rosić was awarded for a runner-up in the Serbian Cup.

Almería
On 16 August 2019, Rosić agreed to a five-year contract with Spanish Segunda División club UD Almería. The following 7 January, after making no appearances, he was loaned to RC Celta de Vigo's reserves in Segunda División B, until June.

On 31 August 2020, Rosić was loaned to CF Fuenlabrada in the second division for the season. He spent the year mainly as a backup to Javier Belman, and moved to Albacete Balompié also in a temporary deal on 4 August 2021. On 30 August 2022, his contract with Almería was terminated by mutual consent.

International career
Rosić was called into the Serbia national under-20 football team in 2017 under coach Milan Obradović. He made his debut for the team on 5 June 2017, replacing Miloš Ostojić in last minutes of the friendly game against Israel. Rosić also appeared in a match against Greece, played at the Karađorđe Stadium on 9 June 2017. As a coach of the Serbian under-21 level, Goran Đorović included Marković to the squad for competitive matches against Macedonia and Russia in September 2018.

Rosić made his debut for Serbia national football team on 25 January 2023 in a friendly match against USA. Serbia won the game 2 – 1, with him coming on in a second half as a substitute.

Career statistics

Club

International

Honours
Mladost Lučani
 Serbian Cup runner up: 2017–18

References

External links
 
 
 
 
 

1996 births
Living people
Sportspeople from Užice
Association football goalkeepers
Serbian footballers
Serbia international footballers
FK Jedinstvo Užice players
FK Mladost Lučani players
FK Kolubara players
Serbian First League players
Serbian SuperLiga players
Segunda División players
Primera Federación players
Segunda División B players
UD Almería players
Celta de Vigo B players
CF Fuenlabrada footballers
Albacete Balompié players
FK Radnički Niš players
Serbian expatriate footballers
Serbian expatriate sportspeople in Spain
Expatriate footballers in Spain